An Afghan personal name consists of a given name and sometimes a surname at the end. Personal names are generally not divided into first and family names; a single name is recognized as a full personal name, and the addition of further components – such as additional given names, regional, or ethnic family/clan names or patronymics – is often a matter of parents' choice. This structure is shared amongst the different ethnicities of Afghanistan and people of Khyber Pakhtunkhwa.

Given names
Traditionally, Afghans only use a first name and lack a last name. This is also the case among Pashtuns in neighbouring Pakistan. Those having only a first name may be distinguished by tribe, place of birth, profession or honorific title. It is generally those from developing regions who are known by a mononym due to the lack of a legal identification system. They may also have multiple mononyms (i.e. may be called by multiple personal names).

Males
Male names are normally compounded, for example Ahmad Khan, in which two words make up one single given name.

Males often have Islamic names derived from Arabic that are popular throughout the Muslim world, whereas females more commonly have names from local Pashto or Persian origin, which itself can have derivations from various Indo-Iranian languages such as Sanskrit.

Male first names very often have two parts, usually the "proper" name and the "subordinate" name. For example:
The full name Mohammad Zaman, which consists of the subordinate name Mohammad and the proper name Zaman.
The full name Ghulam Hazrat, which consists of the subordinate name Hazrat and the proper name Ghulam.

This is not always the case, and sometimes both parts are combined as one, for example:
The full name Abdul Ali
The full name Din Mohammad

In rare cases, a male first name only has a single part, for example the full name Farid, or the full name Homayoun.

Below is a list of assorted Afghan given names of local Pashto or Persian origin or otherwise of Indo-Persian origin.

Females
Female first names tend to have a single component, for example Fereyba, Laila, or Roya. In rarer instances they may have two parts, for example Gol Khanom. Female names of Arabic origin are less common than Arabic male names; some examples are: Jamila, Nadia or Zahra.

The table below shows a list of assorted female names of Pashto or Persian origin (or otherwise of Indo-Persian origin), with many referring to beauty and nature.

Neutral names
Examples of gender-neutral Afghan names include: Gul (meaning "flower"), Lal, Sultan, Taj, and Shaista.

Last names

While most Afghans lack a last name, they are more common among urban populations or the educated or higher class. Last names can represent a father's name, tribal affiliation, or an adjective describing the person. Thus, in some cases, people of the same family may have different last names. Common forms of last names referring to tribal affiliation are:
-ai or -i, usually added to the area of origin, for example Karzai (from Karz, Kandahar), Marghai, Kohistani or Hussaini
-zai or -zoy, meaning "son" in Pashto, for example Ghilzai , Popalzai or Yusufzai.
-khel / khil (in Pashto), meaning "branch", for example Suleimankhel or Omarkhil
(containing) -gul, for example Gulbaz

Tribal names are usually patrilineal. The ancestral line of females generally is not included as part of the identity. Afghan women traditionally do not take their husband's surnames when they marry.

Other known suffixes include:
-ullah, referring to Allah, for example Rahmatullah or Hafizullah
-uddin, for example Shamsuddin or Ghawsuddin
-zada / zadah, meaning "son of" in Persian, for example Khanzada or Shahzada
-bakhsh, "granted by"
'-dad, "given by", for example Baridad

Among ethnic Pashtuns, surnames based on location are not common. For most of their history, Pashtuns have lived a rural, transhumant, semi-nomadic life and therefore surnames tied to cities or locations are rare.  Some tribes identify with locations, such as the Khostwal and Khost, or the Bannuchis and Bannu in Pakistan.

Surnames may also be derived from honorifics, for example Khan which was adopted via cross-cultural exchanges between Turko-Mongol peoples.

Honorifics

Honorifics are also given to some people, for example Khan which is used for men's names, or Jan used for both men's and women's names. For example:
Sharif Khan, Latif Khan, Khalil Jan for males
Sharifa Jan, Latifa Jan for females

Honorific names can signify certain ranks of notability such as royal, religious or occupational status. Below are some examples:
 Agha - sir, mister; a general term of respect
 Khan - served at one time as a title for an honored person 
 Mullah - Muslim cleric
 Mawlawi - Muslim cleric
 Ustad - a master craftsperson, lecturer or a person who is the master of a profession
 Ghazi - military-related
 Dagarwal - military-related
 Sayyid and sharif - honorific titles given to men accepted as descendants of Muhammad
 Sardar
 Khwaja - "lord"
 Akhund - Muslim scholar
 Shah - "king"
 Engineer - someone with the said profession

Addressing

Titles and honorifics
Some honorifics are used in addressing people in place of their actual given name, such as Mullah or Doctor. Patronymic names are also sometimes used in addressing people, for example dokhtare Golbibi meaning "daughter of Golbibi". They can also be used for the person's father's title, for example bache rayis meaning "son of the President".

Nicknames
Nicknames are sometimes used to address someone; the most common are those related to beauty, nature or a brave animal. Examples include:
ezmaray, meaning "lion"
sheragha, meaning "master of the lion"
golagha, meaning "master of the flower"
ghotay meaning "plant"

Diminutives
Used for close friends or children, these are often shorter forms of given names with an -o suffix, for example:
Najmudin > Najo
Khalil > Khalo

Another suffix is -ak or -gak, strictly used only in addressing someone directly. For example bachagak meaning "little boy", or dokhtarak meaning little girl.

Kinship names

Regional differences
Ethnic Pashtuns are more likely to have Pashto names, for example Turyalai Muhammadzai for a male, or Shaperai Isupazai for a female. Speakers of Dari (e.g. the Tajiks) are more likely to have Persian names, for example Bashir Bijan for a male, or Shirin Kuhestani for a female. Ethnic Hazara names tend to contain more Shi'ite related names, like Ali and Hossain.

Names can also display pronunciation differences germane to the two main accents of Pashto. For example, the girl's name "Zarlakht", as pronounced in the Northern Pashto dialect of Kabul or Peshawar (Pakistan), will be pronounced as "Zarlasht" in the Southern Pashto of Kandahar and Quetta (Pakistan).

Transcription and international usage
Since there is no orthographic standardization, and because there are diverse dialects, there are many discrepancies in transcription of Afghan names into English, especially from Pashto. The second component of male names (for example the Khan in Gul Khan) is generally treated as a last name in the West, despite Khan originally being a honorific title.  In an English-speaking country it would be treated as a last name, with Gul the first name, in this case.

The lack of standardization means that English renderings can also vary, for example the name مسعود can be variously transcribed as Massoud, Masoud, or Mas'ud. Interposition of spaces can also vary; for example, both Miakhel and Mia Khel have been used as transliterations of the same name.

Afghans who have a "proper" name before the "subordinate" (for example, the Zaman in Mohamad Zaman Naderi) would likely abbreviate the first component when transcribing the full name in English - in this case, for example, M. Zaman Naderi - or adopt it as a middle name, as: Zaman M. Naderi.

"Pathan" is used as a surname in Pashtun communities living in the Indian subcontinent, because they are known as Pathans or Pashtuns to their neighbouring communities, so they simplify it as a surname rather than their tribal name. Some Tajiks and South Asians have Pashto names, a sign of Pashtun ancestry, or at least patrilineal ancestry. The Dardic Pashayis and Hindkowans do not speak Pashto, but 30-60% of their people live in a Pashtun culture. The assimilated communities may have traces of people with given names derived exclusively from Pashto. "Afghan" is an archaic name, and has been used among Pashtuns in Iran to signify their Pashtun ancestry to other Iranians because they are known as Afghans to Iranians.

See also
 Iranian name
 Pakistani name
 Culture of Afghanistan
 Pashtun culture

References

External links

Names by culture
Afghan culture